José Vidal may refer to:

 José Vidal (Uruguayan footballer) (1896–1974), Uruguayan football player, 1924 Olympic champion
 José Vidal (Venezuelan footballer)
 José Vidal (baseball) (1940–2011), Dominican baseball player
 José María Vidal (1935–1986), Spanish footballer
 Cheche Vidal (José Vidal, born 1959), Venezuelan footballer
 Don José Vidal (1763–1823), Spanish aristocrat involved in Louisiana's colonial period
 José Ángel Vidal (born 1969), Spanish cyclist
 José Vidal Porcar (1924–1992), Spanish racing cyclist